AlphaBat (stylized as AlphaBAT) is a South Korean hiphop boy band formed by Simtong Entertainment in 2013. They are currently under APB Entertainment.

History

Pre-debut 
AlphaBAT originally debuted in 2012 as a duo (Kyumin & Selin) under the agency YUB Entertainment. After leaving the agency, Kyumin left the group. Selin, now going by the stage name "I:ota", continued as a member of AlphaBAT, which grew from a duo to a nine-member group under the company Simtong Entertainment.

2013-2014: Debut with AB City, Ttanttara, Answer 
Although their first performance for AB City was on November 12, 2013, when they recorded the music program Arirang: Simply Kpop, Simtong Entertainment's preferred official debut date for AlphaBAT was on November 14, 2013, the day AlphaBAT took their performance in M! Countdown. AlphaBAT's debut music video and song AB CITY was revealed on March 15.

Later, the boys released a second Christmas-themed digital single Surprise Party, revealing the official name of AlphaBAT's fandom: "Alpha".

Although their first performance was November 12, 2013, it was revealed that AlphaBAT would soon make their return in late February 2014 with their first mini album: Attention. Days before, they had released a single under the name of Always as a gift to their fans for supporting them. They finally revealed the full MV on the 25th, titled Ttanttara.

They returned on August 22, 2014 with their second mini album Answer.

2016 
They will be promoting as five members which includes the addition of new member  who was revealed on AlphaBAT Japan's official Twitter on November 3. A Japanese comeback special was held on December 2. Promotions will be without  due to his enlistment.

2017 
May 23, 2017 AlphaBAT opened a new official Instagram account, indicating they would soon be restarting activities as a group. On June 8, 2017, AlphaBAT appeared for the first time on Naver's Vapp channel Idol x Idol.

July 25, 2017, member  announced his enlistment via his personal Instagram account. As a result, AlphaBAT was left with only four members. July 28, 2017, AlphaBAT released their EP, Get Your Luv, which they had a small showcase for.

On August 7, 2017 AlphaBAT released their music video for their title track, also called "Get Your Luv". They also released the dance practice for their title track on the same day.

On November 3, 2017, AlphaBAT performed "Get Your Luv" on Music Bank, their first time performing the song on a music show.

2018 
In September 2018, the newest member,  was introduced. On October 8, 2018, AlphaBAT released a music video for their title track "New World". The single album also includes another track called "Blockbuster".

Members

Current members






Past members



Kyumin

Timeline

Discography

Extended plays

Singles

Reality show
AlphaBat TV (web show) (03.07.2014 to the TBA)

Awards and nominations

References

External links
Official Fancafe

2013 establishments in South Korea
Musical groups from Seoul
South Korean boy bands
South Korean hip hop groups